Triadica is a plant genus of the family Euphorbiaceae first described as a genus in 1790. It is native to eastern southeastern, and southern Asia.

Species included are:
 Triadica cochinchinensis Lour. - China (Anhui, Fujian, Guangdong, Guangxi, Guizhou, Hainan, Hubei, Hunan, Jiangxi, Sichuan, Taiwan, Yunnan, Zhejiang), Cambodia, Assam, Bangladesh, Bhutan, Nepal, Himalayas of E + N India, Borneo, Sulawesi, Sumatra, Laos, Malaysia, Myanmar, Philippines, Thailand, Vietnam
 Triadica rotundifolia (Hemsl.) Esser - Guangdong
 Triadica sebifera (L.) Small - China (Anhui, Fujian, Gansu, Guangdong, Guangxi, Guizhou, Hainan, Hubei, Jiangxi, Jiangsu, Shaanxi, Shandong, Sichuan, Taiwan, Yunnan, Zhejiang), Japan; naturalized in Himalayas, Cuba, Puerto Rico, SE + SC USA, Sacramento Valley in N California

A species formerly included but moved to Neoshirakia is:
Triadica japonica (Siebold & Zucc.) Baill. - Neoshirakia japonica (Siebold & Zucc.) Esser

References

Hippomaneae
Euphorbiaceae genera